Tangaye may refer to several places in Burkina Faso:
Tangaye, Bam
Tangaye, Gnagna of Gnagna
Tangaye Department